Quodlibet: online journal of Christian theology and philosophy is a peer-reviewed academic journal of philosophy. It deals with issues that present a common ground between philosophy and theology. The journal covers all areas of theology and philosophy with particular attention for Christianity, though not excluding contributions from other perspectives. Both articles and book reviews are published.

This online journal may no longer exist.  For over a year, it had been on "haitus," not accepting articles for publication.  As of December 2019 its official link no longer works.

See also 
 List of philosophy journals

References

External links 
 

Philosophy journals
English-language journals
Publications established in 1999
Religious studies journals